Eric Boulton (born August 17, 1976) is a Canadian former professional ice hockey left winger. Boulton was drafted 234th overall in the ninth round of the 1994 draft by the New York Rangers. While he never played for the Rangers, he played for the Buffalo Sabres, Atlanta Thrashers, New Jersey Devils and New York Islanders between 2000 and 2016. Boulton was best known for his role as an enforcer.

Playing career
Boulton was drafted in the ninth round, 234th overall by the New York Rangers in the 1994 Entry Draft of the National Hockey League (NHL). Despite being drafted by the Rangers, he would eventually make his NHL debut playing for the Buffalo Sabres, where he played for four seasons. During the 2004 NHL Lockout, he played for the Columbia Inferno of the ECHL. After the Lockout ended, Boulton began playing with the Atlanta Thrashers.

In October 2005, Boulton was suspended for six games after elbowing Tampa Bay Lightning rookie Paul Ranger, causing a hairline fracture of the jaw and a concussion. The incident occurred at the end of a 6–0 rout of the Thrashers on October 20, 2005. NHL vice-president Colin Campbell said, "It is clear Mr. Boulton's actions were careless and caused injury. There is no circumstance that can justify this type of action." Only a week earlier, Boulton had made a similar move in a game against the Toronto Maple Leafs, almost injuring Eric Lindros.

Boulton was re-signed by the Thrashers in 2008 to a two-year deal. He recorded his first career hat trick on December 18, 2010, against the New Jersey Devils. He then signed as an unrestricted free agent with the Devils for a 2-year contract worth $575,000 in the first year and $750,000 in the second, joining former Thrashers teammates Ilya Kovalchuk and Johan Hedberg. After a dismal season in which the Devils did not record a single goal for with Boulton on the ice, Boulton was bought out of the final year of his contract on June 30, 2012. The next day, Boulton proceeded to sign a one-year deal with the New York Islanders. He re-signed with the Islanders for the next three consecutive seasons as well, all on one-year deals. Boulton is the Thrashers' all-time leader in penalty minutes with 639 penalty minutes.

After the 2016–17 season, Boulton ended his professional career, however continued his association with the Islanders in accepting a scouting role.

Career statistics

Regular season and playoffs

References

External links

1976 births
Living people
Albany Devils players
Atlanta Thrashers players
Binghamton Rangers players
Bridgeport Sound Tigers players
Buffalo Sabres players
Canadian ice hockey left wingers
Canadian people of English descent
Charlotte Checkers (1993–2010) players
Columbia Inferno players
Florida Everblades players
Fort Wayne Komets players
Ice hockey people from Nova Scotia
Sportspeople from Halifax, Nova Scotia
Kentucky Thoroughblades players
New Jersey Devils players
New York Islanders players
New York Rangers draft picks
Oshawa Generals players
Rochester Americans players
Sarnia Sting players